John Frederick Feeney (1807–1869) was an Irish journalist and newspaper proprietor.

Spending most of his adult life in Birmingham, England, he owned the Birmingham Journal and, with John Jaffray, founded the Birmingham Post.  He emigrated from Sligo, Ireland in 1836 to England via Liverpool and changed the spelling of his surname from Feeny.  He was one of ten children born to John Feeny and Jane Mulvogue, originally from Boyle, County Roscommon, Ireland.

Family

His daughter Florence Feeney married Alexander Inglis of Auchendinny and Redhall. Their children (Feeney's grandchildren) included Charles Edward Inglis FRS and John Alexander Inglis FRSE.

References

A. McCulloch, The Feeneys of the Birmingham Post (Birmingham University Press 2004).

1807 births
1869 deaths
19th-century British newspaper publishers (people)
19th-century British newspaper founders
Feeney family
People from County Roscommon